Novokulchubayevo (Yañı Qolsobay) is a rural locality (a selo) in Bakhtybayevsky Selsoviet, Birsky District, Bashkortostan, Russia. The population was 607 as of 2010. There are 9 streets.

Geography 
Novokulchubayevo is located 26 km northwest of Birsk (the district's administrative centre) by road. Bakhtybayevo is the nearest rural locality.

References 

Rural localities in Birsky District